Acropsopilionidae is a family of harvestmen with 19 described species in 3 genera.

Species

 Acropsopilio Silvestri, 1904
 Acropsopilio australicus Cantrell, 1980
 Acropsopilio boopis (Crosby, 1904)
 Acropsopilio chilensis Silvestri, 1904
 Acropsopilio chomulae (Goodnight and Goodnight, 1948)
 Acropsopilio neozealandiae (Forster, 1948)
 Acropsopilio venezuelensis González-Sponga, 1992
 Austropsopilio Forster, 1955
 Austropsopilio altus Cantrell, 1980
 Austropsopilio cygneus Hickman, 1957
 Austropsopilio fuscus (Hickman, 1957)
 Austropsopilio inermis Cantrell, 1980
 Austropsopilio megalops (Hickman, 1957)
 Austropsopilio novaehollandiae Forster, 1955
 Austropsopilio sudamericanus Shultz and Cekalovic, 2003
 Cadella Hirst, 1925
 Cadella africana (Lawrence, 1931)
 Cadella capensis Hirst, 1925
 Cadella croeseri Staręga, 1988
 Cadella haddadi Lotz, 2011
 Cadella jocquei Staręga, 2008
 Cadella spatulipis Lawrence, 1934

References

Harvestmen
Harvestman families